Ernest Jay (18 September 1893 – 8 February 1957) was a British actor.

Selected filmography

 My Lucky Star (1933) - Press Agent
 Tiger Bay (1934) - Alf
 The Iron Duke (1934) - First Orderly
 The Phantom Light (1935) - Railway Worker (uncredited)
 Checkmate (1935) - Huntly
 Rhodes of Africa (1936) - Minor Role (uncredited)
 Broken Blossoms (1936) - Alf
 Men of Yesterday (1936)
 The House of the Spaniard (1936)
 O.H.M.S. (1937) - (uncredited)
 The Song of the Road (1937) - Tinker
 I See Ice (1938) - Theater Manager
 Don't Take It to Heart (1944) - Tripp, Reporter
 School for Secrets (1946) - Dr. Dainty
 Vice Versa (1948) - Bowler
 Death in the Hand (1948) - MacRae
 Blanche Fury (1948) - Calamy
 So Evil My Love (1948) - Smathers
 The History of Mr. Polly (1949) - Mr. Hinks
 Edward, My Son (1949) - Walter Prothin
 Golden Arrow (1949) - Mr. Felton
 The Reluctant Widow (1950)
 The Franchise Affair (1951) - Ramsden
 I Believe in You (1952) - Mr. Quayle
 Top Secret (1952) - Professor Layton
 Grand National Night (1953) - Railway Official
 The Sword and the Rose (1953) - Lord Chamberlain
 Reluctant Bride (1955) - Minister
 Who Done It? (1956) - Scientist
 Doctor at Large (1957) - Charles Hopcroft
 The Curse of Frankenstein (1957) - Undertaker (uncredited) (final film role)

References

External links

 

1893 births
1957 deaths
Male actors from London
English male stage actors
English male film actors
English male television actors
20th-century English male actors